The First Follett Ministry was the first ministry of the Government of the Australian Capital Territory, and was led by Labor Chief Minister Rosemary Follett and her deputy, Paul Whalan. It was sworn in on 16 May 1989, after the 1989 election when a hung parliament was the outcome. Labor, with a plurality of seats, led a minority government in the Australian Capital Territory Legislative Assembly.

This ministry covers the period from 16 May 1989 (when the Ministry was sworn in) until on 5 December 1989, when Bernard Collaery, the leader of Residents Rally, a minor party in the Assembly, moved the following motion
That this Assembly no longer has confidence in the Chief Minister of the ACT and the minority Labor Government and has confidence in the ability of Mr Kaine to form a government.
The vote was resolved in affirmative (10 to 7 votes), and Trevor Kaine elected Chief Minister as leader of an Alliance Government, comprising members of both the Liberal Party and some (but not all) members of the Residents Rally in the Assembly and the Kaine Ministry formed.

References

Australian Capital Territory ministries
Australian Labor Party ministries in the Australian Capital Territory